Fuel for the Fire was Naked Eyes' 1984 follow-up album to their successful début. The band had Top 40 success with the first single off the album, "(What) In the Name of Love", produced by Arthur Baker, which reached #39 in the US on the Billboard Hot 100 and, in a remix by Baker, #35 on the Dance chart.  The album peaked at #83 on the Billboard Top 200 Albums chart.

While a modest hit, it had not matched the commercial and critical success of their debut; in their home country of the UK, neither the album nor its single had charted.  Baker remixed another track he had produced for the duo, "Sacrifice", but the record company never released a followup to the Top 40 lead single and Naked Eyes disbanded following the underwhelming reception.

The album was released for the first time on CD in 2013 by Cherry Red Records.

Track listing
All songs written by Pete Byrne and Rob Fisher.
Side one
 "(What) In the Name of Love" – 4:24
 "New Hearts" – 3:36
 "Sacrifice" – 4:06
 "Eyes of a Child" – 3:34
 "Once Is Enough" – 4:08
Side two
 "No Flowers Please" – 4:00
 "Answering Service" – 3:42
 "Me I See in You" – 3:33
 "Flying Solo" – 4:30
 "Flag of Convenience" – 4:07

Personnel 

Naked Eyes
 Pete Byrne – lead vocals
 Rob Fisher – keyboards, Fairlight programming, LinnDrum programming

Additional musicians
 Ira Siegel – guitars (1, 3)
 Tony Mansfield – guitars (2, 4–10)
 John Read – bass
 Frank Valardi – drums (1, 3)
 Graham Broad – drums (2, 4–10)
 Tina Baker – backing vocals 
 Cindy Mizelle – backing vocals 
 Wendell Morrison – backing vocals 
 Audrey Wheeler – backing vocals

Production 
 Producers – Arthur Baker (Tracks 1 & 3); Tony Mansfield (Tracks 2 & 4–10).
 Engineers – Jay Burnett (Tracks 1 & 3); Hadyn Bendall (Tracks 2 & 4–10).
 Mastered by Greg Fulginiti at Sterling Sound (New York, NY).
 Art Direction – Henry Marquez
 Design – Michael Diehl
 Photography – Gavin Cochrane

Singles
 "(What) In the Name of Love" (11 August 1984)

References

Naked Eyes albums
1984 albums
Parlophone albums
EMI America Records albums